The State Correctional Institution – Coal Township, commonly referred to as SCI Coal Township, is a Pennsylvania Department of Corrections prison. Thomas McGinley is its superintendent. SCI Coal Township houses about 2,300 inmates.

History
The State Correctional Institution – Coal Township held its official Dedication on April 26, 1993. The construction of SCI Coal Township was part of Governor Casey's Operation Jump Start Program. This construction and expansion program was launched in 1990 to address the prison overcrowding problem, to create jobs and stimulate economic growth. SCI Coal Township was one of five institutions constructed and financed through county or municipal authorities and one of five prototypical state prisons dedicated in 1993.  The Northumberland County Authority was responsible to oversee the construction financing and to develop the lease with the option to buy for the Department of Corrections.

Sexual victimization at SCI Coal Township
According to a study by the United States Department of Justice released in August 2010, 3.9% of inmates who responded to a survey reported that they had been sexually victimized at the prison.

Facility makeup
At SCI Coal Township there are 226 acres of land, 43 inside of the perimeter. There are 34 operational structures at the facility, including 10 housing units consisting of both cells and dormitory-style housing. One of these units is a Special Needs Unit.

Capacity and demographics
According to the June 2015 Capacity Report issued by the DOC, the population was 2,271, this being 118 beds over capacity of 2,153, meaning that the facility is at 105-1/2 % Capacity. The average age of an inmate at Coal Township is 37 and the institution employs 526 full-time employees.

Inmate supports
At SCI Coal Township, there are a plethora of inmate supports available to them, including:

Academic and vocational education
The Academic complement at Coal Township includes Learning Support, Adult Basic Education, GED, Business Education, along with ESL. The Vocational Opportunities provided to inmates at SCI Coal Township include Heating, Air Conditioning and Refrigeration (HVAC), Barber, Computer-Aided Drafting/Design (CADD), Automotive, Custodial Maintenance NCCER, OSHA 10, Flaggers course.  Furthermore, All vocational classes offer industry-recognized certifications specific to the trade skills taught in the program.

Inmate groups and programs
There are programs in the domains of Family/Relationship/Self, Sex Offender, Re-Entry, Alcohol and Other Drug (AOD), Offense Related, along with Mental Health Programs.

Outside opportunities for inmates, families and surrounding residents
 Virtual Visitation
 Community Work Program: The Community Work Program had a total of 1623 hours of community work in 2012.

Notable inmates
 Bryan Freeman, convicted in the Freeman family murders
 Harrison Graham, serial killer who murdered seven women
 Harlow Cuadra, gay pornographic film actor convicted for the murder of gay pornographic film director Brian Kocis

See also

 List of Pennsylvania state prisons

References

External links
SCI Coal Township Site
PA Dept of Corrections Web site

Buildings and structures in Northumberland County, Pennsylvania
Coal Township
1993 establishments in Pennsylvania